Goodwill is an unincorporated community in Mercer County, West Virginia, United States.

The community was named after one Mr. Goodwill, the proprietor of a local mine.

References

Unincorporated communities in Mercer County, West Virginia
Unincorporated communities in West Virginia
Coal towns in West Virginia